Reyza Soudant (born 26 August 1991 in Morocco) is a French footballer.

References

French footballers
Association football midfielders
Living people
1991 births
A.C. Isola Liri players
A.S.D. Sorrento players
FCM Aubervilliers players